Slovo ('Word') was a daily newspaper published in Bulgaria from 1922 until 1924. The newspaper fiercely opposed the Aleksandar Stamboliyski government and also the communist movement.

Aleksandar Grekov served as director of the newspaper. After Grekov was assassinated, Prof. Milev took over the editorship of Slovo.

References

Daily newspapers published in Bulgaria
1922 establishments in Bulgaria
1924 disestablishments
Bulgarian-language newspapers
Publications established in 1922
Publications disestablished in 1924
Defunct newspapers published in Bulgaria